Chrysti the Wordsmith is a radio program about word origins and meanings, produced at KGLT in Bozeman, Montana.  The two-minute show is written and narrated by Chrysti M. Smith, who is also known as Chrysti the Wordsmith.

Radio program
The program began in 1990 and about 3,000 episodes have been recorded.  It airs five days per week on some stations.  It is carried by KGLT, Yellowstone Public Radio, as well as on the Armed Forces Network. T

Words covered include those with origins in antiquity such as titanium, and modern words, such as squeaky clean and chillax.

Philip Gaines, English professor at Montana State University, is the script editor for the program.

Chrysti M. Smith
Smith was born on October 27, 1956 to Carol Gorton Smith and Edward "Bud" Smith. She was raised on a farm in northeastern Montana, near Poplar. After graduation from high school in 1974, she lived in North Carolina, Louisiana and Texas for a decade before returning to Montana to attend Montana State University. Smith initiated the radio series Chrysti the Wordsmith as an undergraduate at MSU. In 1995, she graduated with a Bachelor of Science degree in Sociology/Anthropology. Smith is a professional narrator working in television, documentary film, public service announcements, and radio advertisements.

She has published two books:
Verbivore’s Feast: A Banquet of Word and Phrase Origins from Chrysti the Wordsmith. 2003, Farcountry Press
Verbivore's Feast, Second Course, More Word & Phrase Origins from Chrysti the Wordsmith. 2006, Farcountry Press

References

Further reading

External links
Blog and archive
"Chrysti The Wordsmith: Clean as a Whistle”, KGLT, American Archive of Public Broadcasting (WGBH and the Library of Congress), Boston, MA and Washington, DC, accessed September 14, 2016. Accessible onsite or, in the US only, online.

American radio programs
Montana State University
People from Poplar, Montana